Eleanor Lancaster may refer to:

A candidate in the Progressive Conservative Party candidates, 1977 Ontario provincial election
Eleanor Lancaster (ship), a 19th-century sailing ship

See also
 Eleanor of Lancaster (1318–1372), fifth daughter of Henry, 3rd Earl of Lancaster and Maud Chaworth